Sverresborg Idrettsforening is a Norwegian sports club from Trondheim, Sør-Trøndelag. It has sections for association football, team handball and basketball ("Sverresborg Hoops").

It was founded on 30 October 1931, named after the fortress Sverresborg.

The women's handball team was a club flagship, winning one league title and three cup titles between 1981 and 1986. The men's football team plays in the Third Division, the fourth tier of Norwegian football after being promoted in 2012. It also played in the Third Division earlier but faced relegations in 1994, 1996 and 2005.

References

Official site 

Norwegian handball clubs
Football clubs in Norway
Association football clubs established in 1931
Sport in Trondheim
1931 establishments in Norway
Multi-sport clubs in Norway